Nuestra Belleza Zacatecas 2012, was held at the Teatro Ramón López Velarde of Zacatecas, Zacatecas on July 12, 2012. At the conclusion of the final night of competition Artemisa River from Zacatecas City was crown the winner. Rivera was crowned by Nuestra Belleza Zacatecas titleholder Michelle Román. Ten contestants competed for the title.

Results

Placements

Contestants

|Zacatecas || Mariell Galldri

References

External links
Official Website

Nuestra Belleza México